Pioneabathra is a genus of moths of the family Crambidae. It contains only one species, Pioneabathra olesialis, which is found on the Comoros and the Seychelles and in Mali, the Republic of Congo, the Democratic Republic of Congo, Mozambique, Yemen (Socotra), Zambia, India, Sri Lanka and Australia.

References

Pyraustinae
Crambidae genera
Taxa named by Eugene G. Munroe
Monotypic moth genera